Number 7 Dam is the largest dam built on the Dee River in Mount Morgan, Rockhampton Region, Queensland, Australia. It is also known as Big Dam. It is the primary supply of water to the town of Mount Morgan.

History 
The dam, officially known as the No. 7 Dam, was built by Mount Morgan Gold Mining Company Limited upstream from the Mount Morgan mine in 1900. Due to a serious drought at the time, the dam was not filled until May 1904. The wall was raised by 4.5 metres in 1999. It remained unfilled until 22 November 2000 when water poured over the top of the dam for the first time.

In 2019, artificial fish habitats were introduced into the dam waters to support the release of golden perch fingerlings and other species to improve opportunities for recreational fishing.

In 2021, the dam was depleted due to drought conditions and water had to be trucked to the Mount Morgan water treatment plant at considerable expense to the Rockhampton Regional Council. In November 2022, the council proposed building a potable water pipeline connecting the Gracemere and Mount Morgan water supply networks as an alternative water supply mechanism.

Recreation 
The surrounds of the dam are popular for recreation with playgrounds, barbeques and picnic facilities.

Fish species in the dam include yellow belly, southern saratoga, and redclaw.

References

Reservoirs in Queensland
Dams completed in 1900
Buildings and structures in Central Queensland
Dams in Queensland
Mount Morgan, Queensland